The national park of Gouraya  is one of the coastal national parks of Algeria. It is located in Béjaïa Province, near the shrine of Sidi Touati.

History
The park became an Algerian National Park in 1984, and has been UNESCO-recognized as a biosphere reserve in 2004.

Description
The park owes its name to the Gouraya Mountain (altitude 660m) located within the park's boundaries. The ground elevation in the park oscillates between -135m and 660m. There is also a lake, the Lake Mézaïa.

The park is located on a calcaro-dolomitic ground.

The park is north-east of Béjaïa, close to the city. The park includes many beaches and cliffs, which make it a swimming destination for many Algerians.

Population
The permanent population in the Gouraya National Park is of Berber origins, 1,655 inhabitants across 13 villages.

Wildlife

The park is home to a wide variety of flora and fauna, including Barbary macaques and jackals who live in the park's forests. The Barbary macaque is a primate with a very restricted range in portions of northwestern North Africa and disjunctively in Gibraltar.

In 2011, the French Institut National de la Recherche Agronomique led a phytosociological study which concluded there were 7 vegetation groups belonging to 4 phytosociological classes:
Quercetea ilicis Braun-Blanquet (1947)
Querco-Fagetea Braun-Blanquet & Vlieg (1937)
Crithmo-limonielea Braun-Blanquet (1947)
Asplenietea rupestris (H.M) Braun-Blanquet (1934)

Protected fauna
Tree spurge (Euphorbia dendroides)
Prickly juniper (Juniperus oxycedrus)

Endangered animals
barbary apes (Maccaca sylvanus)
Jackals (Canis aureus algeriensis)
Wild cats (Felis silvestris)
Algerian hedgehoga (Erinaceus algirus)

Marine mammals of national importance
Sperm whales (Physeter macrocephalus)
Short-beaked common dolphin (Delphinus delphis)
Bottlenose dolphin (Tursiops truncatus)
Harbour porpoises (Phocoena phocoena)

Gallery

References

External links
 Official website
Park data on UNEP-WPMC
Barbary Macaque: Macaca sylvanus, Globaltwitcher.com, ed. Nicklas Stromberg

National parks of Algeria
Biosphere reserves of Algeria
Kabylie
Geography of Béjaïa Province
Protected areas established in 1984
Tourist attractions in Béjaïa Province
1984 establishments in Algeria